Jim Carroll (born 10 August 1939) is a former Australian rules footballer who played with Carlton in the Victorian Football League (VFL).

Notes

External links 

Jim Carroll's profile at Blueseum

1939 births
Carlton Football Club players
Australian rules footballers from New South Wales
Living people